Desmiphora aegrota is a species of beetle in the family Cerambycidae. It was described by Bates in 1880. It is known from the United States and Panama.

References

Desmiphora
Beetles described in 1880